Agent Orange Act of 1991 establishes provisions for the National Academy of Sciences to analyze and summarize scientific evidence regarding presumptive military service exposure to defoliants, dioxins, and herbicides, better known as Agent Orange, during the Vietnam War era. The United States Statute endorses an observation of human medical conditions directly related to non-Hodgkin lymphoma, soft-tissue sarcoma, chloracne, and consistent acneform diseases for military personnel who served in the overseas Vietnamese region. The Act of Congress ratifies a medical research compilation of voluntarily contributed blood and tissue samples provided by Vietnam-era veterans serving in Southeast Asia between 1961 and 1975.

The H.R. 556 legislation was passed by the 102nd United States Congressional session and enacted into law by the 41st President of the United States George H. W. Bush on February 6, 1991.

History
Agent Orange Study of 1979
On December 6, 1979, the 96th United States Congress passed H.R. 3892, better known as Veterans Health Programs Extension and Improvement Act of 1979. The Title 38 amendment, better known as Title III: Veterans' Administration Medical Personnel Amendments and Miscellaneous Provisions, was enacted into law by the 39th President of the United States Jimmy Carter on December 20, 1979. House Bill 3892 endorsed the United States Department of Veterans Affairs to conduct an epidemiological study concerning human exposure and the adverse health effects of dioxins and phenoxy herbicides. The persistent, bioaccumulative and toxic substances protocol was subject to approval by the Office of Technology Assessment as stated in the provisions of the H.R. 3892 legislation.

The 96th United States Senate passed bill S. 2096 sanctioning the Agent Orange study to be conducted by the United States Department of Health, Education, and Welfare. On January 2, 1980, President Jimmy Carter vetoed the Senate bill due to the repetitive purpose of the Section 307a1 provisions as stated in House bill 3892.

Title 38 amendments and associated statutes
U.S. Congressional amendments to Title 38 regarding veterans' military benefits.

See also
 
Chemistry of Defoliants and Herbicides

References

United States oversight of chemical weapons

Periodical bibliography

Reading bibliography

Historical video archive

External links
 
 

1991 in law
102nd United States Congress
United States federal veterans' affairs legislation
Aftermath of the Vietnam War
Operation Ranch Hand
Vietnam War
1991 in the United States